Syrphus is a genus of hoverflies.
It can be distinguished from other genera of the tribe Syrphini because it is the only genus that has long hairs on the upper surface of the lower lobe of the calypter (as well as hairs on the rear margin of the calypter as in most Syrphini).

Species

Syrphus annulifemur Mutin, 1997
Syrphus attenuatus Hine, 1922
Syrphus currani Fluke, 1939
Syrphus dimidiatus Macquart, 1834
Syrphus doesburgi Goot, 1964
Syrphus intricatus Vockeroth, 1983
Syrphus knabi Shannon, 1916
Syrphus laceyorum Thompson, 2000
Syrphus monoculus (Swederus, 1787)
Syrphus nitidifrons (Becker, 1921)
Syrphus opinator Osten Sacken, 1877
Syrphus octomaculatus Walker, 1837
S. phaeostigma Wiedemann, 1830
Syrphus rectus Osten Sacken, 1875
Syrphus ribesii (Linnaeus, 1758)
Syrphus sexmaculatus (Zetterstedt, 1838)
Syrphus sonorensis Vockeroth, 1983
Syrphus torvus Osten Sacken, 1875
Syrphus vitripennis Meigen, 1822

References

External links
 
 
 Bugguide, many photos

Hoverfly genera
Syrphinae
Syrphini
Taxa named by Johan Christian Fabricius